Jouko Lindgrén (born 15 April 1955 in Helsinki) is a Finnish competitive sailor and Olympic medalist.

He won a bronze medal in the 470 class at the 1980 Summer Olympics in Moscow, along with his partner Georg Tallberg.

References

1955 births
Living people
Finnish male sailors (sport)
Sailors at the 1980 Summer Olympics – 470
Olympic sailors of Finland
Olympic bronze medalists for Finland
Olympic medalists in sailing
Medalists at the 1980 Summer Olympics
Sportspeople from Helsinki